The West Bengal Police is one of the two police forces of the Indian state of West Bengal. The other being the Kolkata Police, which has a separate jurisdiction across Kolkata.

The West Bengal Police was reorganized under provisions of the Police Act 1861 during the British Raj. It is headed by an officer designated as the Director General of Police who reports to the State Government through the Home (Police) Department. Shri Manoj Malaviya, an IPS officer of the 1986 batch is the DG & IGP of West Bengal Police since December 28, 2021.

The West Bengal Police has jurisdiction concurrent with the twenty-two revenue districts of the State (excluding the metropolitan city of Kolkata) which comprises one of the two general police districts of West Bengal under the Police Act 1861. The other general police district consists of the major portions of the metropolitan area of Kolkata, and has a separate police force (Kolkata Police Commissionerate) constituted and administered under the Calcutta Police Act 1866 & Calcutta (Suburban Police) Act 1866. This arrangement, unique in India, was conceived during colonial times when Calcutta was the capital of British India. The city police have been kept independent of the state police force.

Oraganisational Structure
West Bengal Police Ten Police Ranges in three zones and a Railways zone.

Police commissionerates

A police commissionerate is a law enforcement body especially in the urban parts of the state. The commissionerate is headed by a Commissioner of Police. There are Six commissionerates under West Bengal Police for Urban Area policing. The Howrah, Chandannagar, Asansol-Durgapur & the Siliguri Police commissionerates are headed by Commissioner of Police (CP) who are of the rank of Deputy Inspector General of Police (DIG) while the Bidhanagar and Barrackpore police commissionerates are headed by Commissioner of Police of the rank of Inspector General of Police (IGP). 

All these police commissionerates are under the direct control of Director general of police.
 Asansol–Durgapur Police Commissionerate
 Barrackpore Police Commissionerate
 Bidhannagar City Police
 Chandannagar Police Commissionerate
 Howrah City Police
 Siliguri Police Commissionerate

Organisational divisions

Zones
The police administration in the state is divided into three police zones and a Government Railway Police (GRP) Zone, each headed by an Inspector General of Police. Each Zone consists of one or more Ranges headed by an officer designated as the Deputy Inspector General of Police (or Special Inspector General of Police). In all, there are 28 police districts (including four consisting of Government Railway Police districts), each headed by a Superintendent of Police. The three Zones are South Bengal Zone, Western Bengal Zone and North Bengal Zone, and an office of the IGP Railways.

Besides, there are some other IGP ranked officers in the following department: Coastal Security, Fire & Emergency Services, Training, Provisioning, Armed Police (AP), Enforcement Bureau (EB), Administration, Law & Orders, Telecommunications, CID, Traffic, WBPRB, SVSPA, CIF, STF, Vigilance Commission etc.

Ranges
Each Range comprises two or more districts or one district divided into multiple police districts. The Range is headed by a Deputy Inspector General of Police (DIG). In West Bengal there are 10 ranges. 

Besides, there are DIG ranked officers in the department of Traffic, Railways, States Crime Records Bureau (SCRB), CID West Bengal, Anti Corruption Bureau (ACB), AP Barrackpore, AP Eastern Frontier Rifles (EFR) Salua, AP North Bengal, AP Durgapur, AP Siliguri, Border, Enforcement Bureau (EB), Intelligence Bureau, Fire Services, Head Quarter (HQ), Police Training Center (PTS), Training, Personnel & Weapon, Provisioning, Telecommunication, WBNVF, Civil Defence etc.

Districts
Each Police District is either coterminous with the Revenue district or in the case of Government Railway Police districts, is located within a number of revenue districts. It is headed by a District Superintendent of Police (or simply called Superintendent of Police). Each district comprises two or more Sub-Divisions, several Circles and Police Stations.
But in recent times, several districts are divided into police districts for better police administration. Each of those police districts are headed by an SP.

Sub-Divisions
Each Sub-Division is headed by one Police officer of the rank Deputy Superintendent of Police (members of West Bengal Police Service, a directly recruited officer or one promoted from the ranks) or an Assistant Superintendent of Police (members of Indian Police Service). In West Bengal, the officer who heads a Sub-Division is known as SDPO i.e. Sub Divisional Police Officer.

Circles
A Circle comprises several Police Stations within a sub-division. An Inspector of Police who heads a police circle is the Circle Inspector of Police or CI.

Stations
A Police Station is the basic unit of policing, responsible for prevention and detection of crime, maintenance of public order, enforcing law in general as well as for performing protection duties and making security arrangements for the constitutional authorities, government functionaries, representatives of the public in different legislative bodies and local self governments, public figures etc.

A Police Station is headed by either a Sub-Inspector (lower subordinate rank), mostly in rural areas or an Inspector (an upper subordinate rank), mostly in urban areas. Police outposts are headed by a Sub-Inspector or Assistant Sub Inspector. After the year 2009 both ASI and SI have equal investigation power and both serve as duty officers.

Police ranks

The Director General functions from the West Bengal Police Directorate, located in the Writers' Buildings, the State Government's main Secretariat in Central Kolkata. He is assisted by a team of senior officers from the ranks of Additional Director General & Inspector General of Police to Assistant Inspector General of Police (AIG — a post equivalent in rank and status to the Superintendent of Police). Officers of the rank of Deputy Superintendent of Police are selected by the West Bengal Public Service Commission through the West Bengal Civil Service (Executive & other services) examinations. In addition to this, the directly recruited Sub Inspectors of Police may also become Deputy Superintendent of Police on promotion.

The West Bengal Police maintains the following ranks:

Organisation
The Police Manual of West Bengal Police was compiled and issued during British Raj and is known as the Police Regulations of Bengal(PRB), 1943 and with subsequent modifications and corrections, is the guiding source of internal Police Organization and Administration under its area of responsibility. The WBP is divided into a number of units:

Local Intelligence Unit
Post 2014 Burdwan blast, which unearthed Bangladesh-based militant group Jamaat-ul-Mujahideen Bangladesh, middle-east's terrorist group Islamic State and Pakistan's Inter-Services Intelligence terror module, the need for strengthening the local intelligence gathering mechanism was first felt. Following the incident the state govt has set up a new intelligence agency to counter terrorism, bust terror modules and invigilate suspicious movements in West Bengal and also to foil militant infiltration into the state.

Armed Police
The Armed Battalions consisting of State Armed Police (SAP), Eastern Frontier Rifles (EFR) and India Reserve Battalions (IRBs),

Civil Police
The Civil Police consists of the Criminal Investigation Department (CID), Counter Insurgency Force (CIF), Enforcement Branch (EB), Intelligence Branch (IB), Traffic Branch, Police Telecommunications, Training Wing, State Crime Records Bureau (SCRB) & Police Computer Centre (PCC).

STRACO
An elite force named "STRACO" has been created to combat insurgency & terrorism, posted in West Zone to fight Maoist guerrillas. WBP is raising another new "Counter Insurgency" force on the line of Gray Hound Special Force of Andhra Pradesh Police.

STF
West Bengal government  created  new directorate of the Special Task Force under West Bengal Police.
The Special Task Force (STF) of West Bengal, formed around three years ago, to combat modern urban organized crimes - terrorism, organized gangs, illegal arms, ammunition, drugs and fake currency across the state is all set to get a police station of its own and a designated court.

SVSPA
The Swami Vivekananda State Police Academy (SVSPA) is the state level police training institution catering to the training needs of West Bengal Police and Kolkata Police. The Academy conducts basic training for DSP Probationers, Cadet Sub-Inspectors of both Armed & Un-Armed branches and Recruit Constables for West Bengal Police and also for Warders and Inspectors of Correctional Services, Sub-Inspectors and Sergeants of Kolkata Police. The Academy also conducts Pre-promotional training for Constables, Asst. SI's and SI's for their promotion to the next rank besides conducting various short in- service training courses on different professional issues. SVSPA is well equipped with in-house faculty members both for academic indoor training and outdoor training. Besides, a number of eminent faculty members from different disciplines take classes for the training programs. These include academicians, experts from Forensic Science Medicine, scientific officers/experts from Forensic Science Laboratory (FSL) & Central Forensic Science Laboratory (CFSL), lawyers, judicial  officers  and  senior police officers.

Recruitments
Entries are done at the following ranks:
 Recruitments to the posts of Constables / Lady constables, Sub Inspectors and Lady Sub inspectors are done by West Bengal Police Recruitment Board.
 West Bengal Police Service: Officers selected through West Bengal Civil Service (Group-B) etc., examination conducted by West Bengal Public Service Commission are appointed as Deputy Superintendent of Police.
 Indian Police Service: Officers selected through Civil Service Examinations conducted by Union Public Service Commission are appointed as Assistant Superintendent of Police during their probationary period. Upon confirmation to the service, they are appointed as Additional Superintendent of Police.

Eastern Frontier Rifles

The Eastern Frontier Rifles are an armed police force of the WBP, the purpose of which is to control major law & order problems, communal riots and terrorist attacks. Many contingents of EFR are deployed in various disturbed areas of the State. However, in recent years the effectiveness of this force has been weakened by overuse and prolonged deployment at Police Stations for day-to-day law & order duties. The headquarters of EFR is at Salua, near Kharagpur.

Counter Insurgency Force

The specialised force of the CIF was raised by the Government following the worsening situation in the Jungle Mahals. The force was charged with the specific task of curbing presence of the maoists within the state. The force was allowed its own recruiting process so as to select the best men from within the force. The force is headed by an Additional Director General of Police ranked officer.

Insignia of West Bengal Police (State Police)

Equipment 

INSAS rifle in 5.56mm NATO
OFB Excalibur Rifle - 292 unit on order.
Revolvers 
Pistol Auto 9mm 1A
AK 47
Heckler & Koch MP5
Sterling Submachine Gun : Indian Version 
SLR: Indian Version of FN FAL
7.62mm SLR: With special tube attachment.
Lee-Enfield .303 British Rifle : Indian Version
OFB 12 Bore Pump Action Gun.
51mm Mortar
0.203 Riot Gun
Gas Gun
Grenade

See also 
 Kolkata Police
 West Bengal CID

Notes

References

External links
 List of all West Bengal police stations from the West Bengal govt's official site
 Criminal Investigation Department, West Bengal

State law enforcement agencies of India
 
1861 establishments in British India
Government agencies established in 1861